Cassandra Blanchard is a Canadian poet. Her debut collection, Fresh Pack of Smokes, was the 2020 winner of the ReLit Award for poetry.

A member of the Selkirk First Nation originally from Whitehorse, Yukon, she is currently based in Duncan, British Columbia, following a number of years living in Vancouver. Fresh Pack of Smokes is written as prose poetry, forming what has been described as a poetic memoir of her past experiences with drug addiction, sex work and coming out as queer.

References

21st-century Canadian poets
21st-century Canadian women writers
21st-century First Nations writers
Canadian women poets
First Nations poets
First Nations women writers
LGBT First Nations people
Canadian LGBT poets
Writers from Whitehorse
Writers from British Columbia
Living people
Year of birth missing (living people)
21st-century Canadian LGBT people